The Gun Ranger is a 1936 American Western film directed by Robert N. Bradbury.

Plot summary

Cast
Bob Steele as Dan Larson
Eleanor Stewart as Molly Pearson
John Merton as Kemper Mills
Ernie Adams as Wally Smeed
Earl Dwire as Bud Cooper
Budd Buster as Carl Beeman
Frank Ball as The Judge
Horace Murphy as Ranch cook

Soundtrack

See also
Bob Steele filmography

External links

1936 films
1936 Western (genre) films
American black-and-white films
Republic Pictures films
American Western (genre) films
Films with screenplays by George H. Plympton
Films directed by Robert N. Bradbury
1930s English-language films
1930s American films